Lonely Eyes may refer to:

Lonely Eyes, album by Tom Harrell 1989
"Lonely Eyes", single by Robert John, written by Mike Piccirillo 1979
"Lonely Eyes" (Chris Young song), 2014
"Lonely Eyes", song by	Kata, written E. Fisherman 1989
"Lonely Eyes", song by Platinum Weird from Make Believe
"Lonely Eyes", song by	Randy Barlow